The Hadith al-Thaqalayn refers to a hadith attributed to the Islamic prophet Muhammad that introduces the Quran and his progeny as the only sources of divine guidance after his death. Widely reported by both Shia and Sunni authorities, the Hadith al-Thaqalayn is of particular significance for the Twelver Shia, where their Twelve Imams are viewed as the spiritual and political successors of Muhammad.

Hadith al-Thaqalayn 
There are also several slightly different versions of this hadith in Sunni sources. The version that appears in the canonical Sunni collection Musnad Ahmad is as follows:

Muhammad might have repeated this statement on multiple occasions, including the Farewell Pilgrimage shortly before his death. The version of this hadith in the Sunni collection as-Sunan al-kubra also includes the warning, "Be careful how you treat the two [treasures] after me." According to the Shia Tabatabai, the Hadith al-Thaqalayn has been transmitted through more than a hundred channels by over thirty-five of Muhammad's companions.

Ahl al-Bayt

Muslims disagree as to who belong to the Ahl al-Bayt, a term which also appears in verse 33:33 of the Quran, known as the Verse of Purification. Shia Islam limits the Ahl al-Bayt to the Ahl al-Kisa, namely, Muhammad, his daughter Fatima, her husband Ali, and their two sons, Hasan and Husayn. There are various views in Sunni Islam, though a typical compromise is to include also Muhammad's wives in the Ahl al-Bayt. In Shia theology works, the Ahl al-Bayt often also includes the remaining Shia Imams. The term is sometimes loosely applied in Shia writings to all descendants of Ali and Fatima.

Inclusion of the Ahl al-Kisa 
The majority of the traditions quoted by al-Tabari in his exegesis identify the Ahl al-Bayt in the Verse of Purification with the Ahl al-Kisa, namely, Muhammad, Ali, Fatima, Hasan, and Husayn. These traditions are also cited by some other early Sunni authorities, including Ahmad ibn Hanbal, al-Suyuti, al-Hafiz al-Kabir, and Ibn Kathir. The canonical Sunni collection Sunnan al-Tirmidhi reports that Muhammad limited the Ahl al-Bayt to Ali, Fatima, and their two sons when the Verse of Purification was revealed to him. In the Event of Mubahala, Muhammad is believed to have gathered these four under his cloak and referred to them as the Ahl al-Bayt, according to Shia and some Sunni sources, including the canonical Sahih Muslim and Sunan al-Tirmidhi. Veccia Vaglieri writes that Muhammad recited the Verse of Purification every morning when he passed by Fatima's house to remind them of the  prayer. This makeup of the Ahl al-Bayt is echoed by Veccia Vaglieri and Jafri, and unanimously reported in Shia sources.

Inclusion of Muhammad's wives 
Possibly because the earlier injunctions in the Verse of Purification are addressed at Muhammad's wives, some Sunni authors, such as Ibn Kathir, include Muhammad's wives in the Ahl al-Bayt. A number of Sunni hadiths also support the inclusion of Muhammad's wives in the Ahl al-Bayt. This view is shared by Goldziher and his coauthors. Alternatively, Leaman argues that only those wives of prophets who mother their successors are counted by the Quran in their .

Significance in Sunni Islam 
Esposito elaborates, "The Prophet Muhammad is seen as the 'living Quran,' the embodiment of God's will in his behavior and words. Both Sunni and Shia Muslims uphold the Quran and the Sunna, though the Shia extends Sunna to also include the traditions and practices of their Imams.

Significance in Twelver Shia Islam 
Hadith al-Thaqalayn implies that the Quran and Muhammad's progeny jointly serve as the only source of divine guidance after Muhammad, writes the Twelver Tabatabai. He argues that a divine guide must be infallible lest he leads his followers astray. As such, he notes, Muhammad's progeny in the hadith must refer only to specific descendants of Muhammad, whom the Twelvers refer to as Imams. In particular, Tabatabai argues that the earth is never void of an infallible Imam of Muhammad's descent as the leader and guide of humankind in his time by divine designation. These are the Twelve Imams for the Twelver Shia. The last of these Imams, Muhammad al-Mahdi, went into occultation in 260/873-874 and his advent is awaited by the Twelvers. While there are differences in details, the belief in the eschatological Mahdi remains popular among all Muslims, possibly owing to numerous traditions to this effect in canonical Sunni and Shia sources.

See also

References

Sources 

 
 
 
 
 
 
 
 
 
 
 
 
 

 
 
 
 
 

Hadith
 Shia Islam
 Sunni Islam
The Fourteen Infallibles